Peter Hill (8 August 1931 – 8 January 2015) was an English professional footballer who played as an inside forward. Born in Heanor, Hill played for Rutland United and Coventry City.

References

1931 births
2015 deaths
English footballers
Coventry City F.C. players
English Football League players
Association football inside forwards
People from Heanor
Footballers from Derbyshire